Cathy Bou Ndjouh (born 7 November 1987) is a Cameroonian football defender, currently playing for FC Minsk. She had played for Nigerian club Rivers Angels F.C. who were the Champions and Cup winners of the Nigerian Female Football League 2014.

Honours 
FC Minsk
Winner
 Belarusian Women's Super Cup: 2015

References

External links 
 

1987 births
Living people
Cameroonian women's footballers
Women's association football defenders
Rivers Angels F.C. players
FC Minsk (women) players
Cameroon women's international footballers
2015 FIFA Women's World Cup players
African Games silver medalists for Cameroon
African Games medalists in football
Competitors at the 2015 African Games
Cameroonian expatriate women's footballers
Cameroonian expatriate sportspeople in Belarus
Expatriate women's footballers in Belarus
Cameroonian expatriate sportspeople in Nigeria
Expatriate footballers in Nigeria Women Premier League
20th-century Cameroonian women
21st-century Cameroonian women